Gunnar Milton Hansen (March 4, 1947 – November 7, 2015) was an Icelandic-born American actor and author best known for playing the mentally impaired cannibal Leatherface in The Texas Chain Saw Massacre (1974).

Early life
Hansen was born in Reykjavík, Iceland, to Icelander Skúli Hansen, a dentist, and Norwegian Sigrid Hansen. He moved to the United States with his mother and brother when he was five years old. He lived in Maine until age eleven, when his family moved to Austin, Texas, where he attended Austin High School and the University of Texas at Austin. He majored in English and mathematics as an undergraduate and then went to graduate school in Scandinavian Studies and English.

Career
His first job out of high school was as a computer operator before he began theater work during college. He was also a football player during high school and for a while a bar bouncer. In 1973, just after finishing graduate school, Hansen heard that The Texas Chain Saw Massacre was being filmed in Austin and decided to audition. He got the part of Leatherface, the masked killer in the movie.

After writing (and occasionally editing) for magazines and writing books, Hansen returned to acting in 1988, appearing in the horror spoof Hollywood Chainsaw Hookers. He acted in 20 films thereafter, including Texas Chainsaw 3D as one of the Sawyers. He considered his later acting as a side project and continued to write books. He also wrote film scripts and wrote and directed documentary films.

Hansen was also an author; his nonfiction travel memoir, Islands at the Edge of Time; A Journey to America's Barrier Islands, was published in 1993. In 2013 he wrote the nonfiction book Chain Saw Confidential about the making of and reception for The Texas Chain Saw Massacre. In addition, he taught college as an adjunct instructor.

Death
Hansen died at his home in Northeast Harbor, Maine, of pancreatic cancer on November 7, 2015, at the age of 68.

Filmography

As self
 1984 Terror in the Aisles archival footage 
 1988 Texas Chainsaw Massacre: A Family Portrait 
 2000 Texas Chainsaw Massacre: The Shocking Truth 
 2001 Leatherface Speaks: An Informal Interview with Gunnar Hansen
 2002 Behind the Attic Door: The Making of "Rachel's Attic"
 2004 UnConventional 
 2006 Flesh Wounds: Seven Stories of the Saw

See also
The White Bird

References

External links

Gunnar Hansen official website

1947 births
2015 deaths
Gunnar Hansen
American male film actors
Austin High School (Austin, Texas) alumni
Gunnar Hansen
Deaths from pancreatic cancer
Deaths from cancer in Maine
20th-century American writers
21st-century American writers
People from Northeast Harbor, Maine
American memoirists
20th-century American male actors
21st-century American male actors